"Whiskey Bent and Hell Bound" is a song written and recorded by American musician Hank Williams Jr.  It was released in September 1979 as the first single and title track from his album of the same name.  It peaked at number 2 on the U.S. Billboard Hot Country Singles chart and reached number-one on the Canadian RPM Country Tracks chart.

Background
Hank wrote the song while hanging out with the Allman Brothers. Hank came up with the opening lines after Dickey Betts asked him how he writes country songs, Hank replied with "Well I got a good woman at home." the rest was allegedly written in 10 minutes

Chart performance

References

Hank Williams Jr. songs
1979 singles
Songs written by Hank Williams Jr.
Song recordings produced by Jimmy Bowen
Elektra Records singles
Curb Records singles
1979 songs
Songs about alcohol